Sheree Angela Harris (born 27 January 1959) is a New Zealand former  cricketer who played as a right-arm pace bowler. She appeared in two One Day Internationals for New Zealand at the 1978 Women's World Cup. She played domestic cricket for Canterbury and Southern Districts.

Harris was born in Waikari, a small town in the Canterbury region. She made her debut for the Canterbury women's team during the 1975–76 season. Harris made her international debut for New Zealand at the 1978 World Cup in India, aged 18. She opened the bowling with Eileen Badham against Australia in the first match of the tournament, conceding 19 runs from three overs without taking a wicket. She did not bowl in the next match against India, and was absent from the team for the final match against England. For the last few seasons of her domestic career (in the mid-1980s), Harris played for the short-lived Southern Districts team.

References

External links
 
 

1959 births
Living people
People from Waikari
New Zealand women cricketers
New Zealand women One Day International cricketers
Canterbury Magicians cricketers
Southern Districts women cricketers
Cricketers from Canterbury, New Zealand